DelSolar (traditional Chinese:旺能光電; simplified Chinese: 旺能光电 (pinyin: wàng néng guāng diàn), commonly abbreviated 旺能)) (3599, TW) is solar company from Delta group (台達電子/台達集團), engaging in the research, design, manufacture and distribution of solar cells, solar modules, as well as the development of Photovoltaic system. The company’s headquarters is in Hsinchu, Science-based industrial Park, Phrase II, Taiwan.

History 
Founded in 2004 by the alliance between the parent company, Delta Electronics, the world's largest provider of switching power supplies and brushless fans, and the Industrial Technology Research Institute (ITRI), a non-profit research institute located in Taiwan under the supervision of the Republic of China Ministry of Economic Affairs. DelSolar has started its initial solar cell production in 2005 and launched the first solar module series in 2009.  
The company is listed on Taiwan’s Emerging Board in 2007.

The name DelSolar is a merger of “Delta” and “solar”, the name of the parent company and DelSolar’s main focused industry.

Product history 
DelSolar has started its initial solar cell production in 2005 with the capacity of 25 megawatts and launched the first solar module series in 2009 with up to 230W power output.  The company had 11 production lines with total capacity of 436 megawatts by the end of 2010. DelSolar is executing its capacity expansion plans given the robust trend in demand. On 4 June 2010, DelSolar announced its ceremony for Jhunan plant, which is expected to be completed and begin its mass production in Q2, 2011. The estimated solar cell production capacity could reach 3 GW. The second manufacturing plant, which is planned as a module plant, is expected to be completed at the end of 2012. The module capacities of DelSolar are 45 and 70 megawatts in the Hsinchu and Wujiang plants, respectively. Wujiang plant is expected to reach the total solar module capacity at 1 GW in year 2013.

Market performance 
In 2009, the total shipment of DelSolar is 90.8 MW. According to the company’s 2009 financial report, total revenues was US$135 M. Approximately 60% of sales have in Europe. DelSolar has started their module business in US and is optimistic about US market as the company will leverage their market resources in US.

PV system installation

World games stadium, Kaohsiung, Taiwan: 1MW 
8,844 solar panels were installed. The project is completed in October, 2008. In the first 9 months, the photovoltaic system has generated 110 million MWh of electricity as the annual amount of electricity agreed in the contract.  It is expected to generate 1.14 GWh of electricity per year, with the ability to sell surplus energy during the non-game period. The solar panels reduce annual carbon dioxide output by 660 tons.

River of Life Christian Church, California, US: 120kW 
Approximately 510 230W high power DelSolar solar modules have been mounted on ROLCC’s roof top. The 117 KW system will generate 180,800 KWh of clean power annually, more than 4.5 GWh over 25 years. The church will prevent approximately 5 million pounds of greenhouse gas emissions over 25 years.

DelSolar (Wujing) plant, Wujing, China: 115 kW 
The photovoltaic system contains 110 kWp of DelSolar’s standard modules and 4 kWp light-through BIPV modules, which has generated 15,946 degree of electricity so far.

Taichung fire power plant, Taichung, Taiwan: 1.5 MW

Caserta site, Italy: 308.2 KWh [under construction]

Vrapice, Czech Republic: 1MW

Products

Solar cell 
DelSolar’s solar cell includes monocrystalline and polycrystalline silicon-based cells, with size of 6 inch, 2 busbars or 3 busbars and the wafer thickness of 180 to 200 mm.

Solar module 
DelSolar’s solar module includes monocrystalline and polycrystalline silicon solar modules and black modules. DelSolar’s modules can provide positive power tolerances of up to +3%, which offer a stable and high-energy system output.

Photovoltaic system 
The company also offers a full set of Photovoltaic system design, including, feasibility study, financing, site planning, engineering, procurement, construction, operation and maintenance. DelSolar has supplied or installed solar modules in many Photovoltaic systems worldwide, such as Kaohsiung National Stadium in Taiwan and River of Life Christian Church in US.

Global operation 
DelSolar has 3 manufacturing facilities, located at Hsinchu and Jhunan, Taiwan and Wujiang, China, as well as the representative offices in Taiwan, China, United States, the Netherlands.

References 

Taiwanese companies established in 2004
Solar energy companies
Companies based in Hsinchu
Energy companies established in 2004
Renewable energy technology companies
Taiwanese brands
Technology companies of Taiwan